Antun Bauer can refer to:

 Antun Bauer (archbishop) (1856–1937), Croatian theologian, philosopher and Archbishop
 Antun Bauer (museologist) (1911–2000), Croatian museologist and collector
 Anton-Martin Bauer (born 1963), Austrian Olympic equestrian